A Rhetoric of Irony is a book about irony by American literary critic Wayne Booth. Booth argues that in addition to forms of literary irony, there are ironies that lack a stable referent.

References

1974 non-fiction books
Books about irony